The Warsaw tram network is a  tram system serving a third of Warsaw, Poland, and serving half the city's population. It operates 726 cars, and is the second-largest system in the country (after the Silesian system) There are about 25 regular lines, forming a part of the city's integrated public transport system organized by the Warsaw Transport Authority. Since 1994 the system is operated by the municipally-owned company Tramwaje Warszawskie sp. z.o.o.

History

Horse tram

This was in order to circumvent limitations imposed by Russian authorities, which prevented the construction of a railway bridge for strategic reasons. In 1880, a second line was constructed with the help of Belgian capital, this time intended as public transit within the city. The Belgian company quickly expanded its own lines, and in 1882 took over the line between the railway stations, which has lost most of its original purpose after a railway bridge was finally built in 1875. In 1899 the entire tram system, by then  of tracks with 234 tram cars and 654 horses operating 17 lines, was purchased by the city. By 1903, plans were drafted to convert the system to electric trams, which was done by 1908.

Interbellum

The development mostly stagnated for the next 10 years with only a few short stretches built. In 1927, a privately owned light rail line called EKD (today Warszawska Kolej Dojazdowa) was built, connecting several neighboring towns with the center of Warsaw using electric motor coaches similar to trams, only faster, larger and more massive, with frequent stops and tracks running along the streets in city; however the system was incompatible with the Warsaw trams as it used standard gauge tracks while the city network still used Russian gauge left from Russian times. In 1925, the company operating the Warsaw trams decided to construct a underground system. Preliminary boring started, but the work was suspended because of the Great Depression; the idea resurfaced in 1938, but was again buried with the outbreak of World War II.

Second half of the 20th century

The tram system remained operational, although gradually deteriorating, during most of the Nazi occupation until the Warsaw Uprising in 1944, after which all the infrastructure was systematically destroyed. After the war it was rebuilt relatively fast. As the system was practically built from scratch the occasion was used to convert it to standard gauge. During the 1950s and 1960s, the network was extended to newly built districts of soviet style panel houses and industrial plants and newer trams based on the design of Presidents' Conference Committee were introduced. Due to the city's lack of a metro system and restriction on car ownership, the tram system remained the backbone of Warsaw's transport system. In the 1960s, however, a political decision was made to increase the dependency on oil imported from Russia, while Polish coal was to be exported to Western Europe in exchange for hard currency; as a result, newly developed districts were connected with the city center by buses rather than trams, and some of the existing tracks were closed.

Present situation
After 1989, the tram system in Warsaw initially received little investment with a large part of the city's budget spent on the construction of the first Warsaw Metro line. However, since 2005, the situation has been changing with the purchase of new rolling stock, modernization of key tram lines, and deployment of a passenger information system. Plans also include extension of the network and an "intelligent" traffic management system which is to prioritize trams at traffic lights. In August 2008, a tender for delivery of 186 low-floor, air-conditioned trams was launched, allowing for a dramatic overhaul of the look of the tramway system.

In 2014 a first entirely new line since a quarter century was opened, connecting a quickly growing remote residential district Tarchomin on the north-eastern outskirts of the city with the existing tram network and the M1 metro line. The route is undergoing further expansion with the latest 1km long segment finished in September of 2021 after multiple delays. Two more new lines are being planned: one with 4km of new tracks to Gocław, and another almost 20km to a southern suburb of Wilanów, but it is unclear when work will start on either of them.

Rolling stock

Tram depots

Historic fleet 
Sources:

Tickets 

There is a single fare system for every mode of transportation. Tickets can be purchased at ticket machines and newsagents all over the city, as well as using a mobile app.

Route list

This is a list of Warsaw Tramway lines. As of 2015, there were several track closures all over the tramway system, due to the construction of the second metro line. This list shows tram lines which are operating as of 4 September 2019 and the routes they operate on as of the same date.

The standard headway is every 8 minutes during peak hours and every 12 minutes off-peak, but the trams on lines 1, 9, 17, 31 and 33 run every 4–6 minutes. Line 2 has the most frequent service with trams running every 2 minutes during peak hours.

See also

 List of town tramway systems in Poland
 Warsaw Metro
 Zarząd Transportu Miejskiego w Warszawie

Notes

References

External links
 
Warsaw Transport Authority – network maps
Tramwar – a private website about trams in Warsaw 

Tram
Warsaw
Warsaw